Labhu Ram (1883-1976), better known by his pen name Josh Malsiyani, was an Indian Urdu poet who much acclaimed during his time.

He was born in a poor family in the Aquilpur locality of Malsian, a small town near Jalandhar which town was the domain of Bedi family till Sir Kalim Singh Bedi’s migration to Rawalpindi in the 19th-century. Josh’s father, who mostly lived in Peshawar, was an illiterate small-trader. After being trained as a teacher in Lahore Josh started teaching Urdu and Persian in a school in Jalandhar but in 1913 settled permanently in Nakodar where he spent the rest of his life as a school-teacher and guiding budding Urdu poets.

He had himself started writing Urdu poems when he was eight years old and later on became a disciple of Mirza Khan Daagh Dehlvi. Ratan Pandoravi,  Sahir Hoshiarpuri and Naresh Kumar Shad were his pupils. He is known for his book - Sharh- e – Diwaan – Ghalib, which is a scholarly commentary on Ghalib’s Urdu poetry.

Malik Ram’s assessment of Josh Malsiyani’s poetry and contribution finds place amongst fifty-two poets whose lives and works have been discussed in his monumental work - Tazkirah e muasireen, Vol.4. Josh Malsiyani was a recipient of Padma Shri Award. His son Arsh Malsiani was also an Urdu poet.

References

Urdu-language poets from India
1883 births
1976 deaths
Hindu poets
20th-century Indian poets
Indian male poets
Poets from Punjab, India
Recipients of the Padma Shri in literature & education
20th-century Indian male writers
Writers from Amritsar
People from Amritsar district
Poets in British India